Valeriana aretioides is a species of plant in the family Valerianaceae. It is endemic to Ecuador. Its natural habitat is subtropical or tropical high-altitude grassland.

References

Flora of Ecuador
aretioides
Least concern plants
Taxonomy articles created by Polbot
Taxobox binomials not recognized by IUCN